Anthony J. Russo Jr. (October 14, 1936 – August 6, 2008) was an American researcher who assisted Daniel Ellsberg, his friend and former colleague at the RAND Corporation, in copying the Pentagon Papers.

Early life
Russo was born in Suffolk, Virginia. He graduated from Virginia Tech with a degree in aeronautical engineering in 1960, then worked on a NASA space capsule program. He continued his education at Princeton University, earning master's degrees in aeronautical engineering and in public affairs. He began working at the RAND Corporation as a researcher in the late 1960s.

Pentagon Papers and trial

Russo and Ellsberg were charged with espionage, theft, and conspiracy. On May 11, 1973, a federal court judge dismissed all charges against them.  Judge William M. Byrne Jr. dismissed the case in May 1973 before it reached a jury, after the office of Ellsberg's psychiatrist had been burglarized and the Federal Bureau of Investigation (FBI) had lost records of what may have been illegally taped telephone conversations. Byrne was also offered the position of FBI director by John Ehrlichman during the trial.

Death
Russo died of natural causes at his home in Suffolk, Virginia on August 6, 2008.

See also 

Espionage Act of 1917
New York Times Co. v. United States

References

External links

"Top Secret: Battle for the Pentagon Papers"   a resource site that supports a currently-playing docu-drama about the Pentagon Papers. The site provides historical context, time lines, bibliographical resources, information on discussions with current journalists, and helpful links.
Official website for "Secrets: A Memoir of Vietnam and the Pentagon Papers" by Daniel Ellsberg
Podcast of a live panel discussion moderated by Jill Abramson, New York Times managing editor and former Washington bureau chief, marking the 35th anniversary of the Supreme Court ruling.
VIDEO Mike Gravel tells the story of how he released the secret Pentagon Papers into the public record
1971 - The Pentagon Papers A report from Steve Holt of WCBS Newsradio 880 (WCBS-AM New York) Part of WCBS 880's celebration of 40 years of newsradio.
Beacon Press & The Pentagon Papers

1936 births
2008 deaths
American whistleblowers
People from Suffolk, Virginia
People acquitted under the Espionage Act of 1917
Princeton University alumni
RAND Corporation people
Virginia Tech alumni